Borneo Jazz Festival is a 2-night festival of 4 performances in each night by local and international jazz musicians at Parkcity Everly hotel in Miri, Sarawak. The festival is one of the longest running Jazz festival in the region. The 2019 edition of the festival will be held on 19 to 21 July.

History
Borneo Jazz Festival was started in 2006. The event is organised by the Sarawak Tourism Board, endorsed by Tourism Malaysia and is jointly supported by the Ministry of Tourism and Culture, Malaysia and Ministry of Tourism, Sarawak. The festival was formerly known as Miri International Jazz Festival before it was renamed to Borneo Jazz Festival in 2011.

The Borneo Jazz is wholly owned by Sarawak Tourism Board and organised by No Black Tie.

Programme
In 2018 the festival introduced Borneo Jazz Talent Search as part of their musical outreach programme. For 2019 edition, the festival’s music outreach will expand to include the Borneo Jazz DJ Search.

Performers
Lineups of the festival since 2014 are:

Attendance
The festival attendance has grown steadily from 3,000 spectators in 2006 to 8,000 spectators in 2014.

References

Jazz festivals in Malaysia
Festivals in Malaysia
Music festivals established in 2006
Events in Sarawak